Aluizio Abranches is a Brazilian film director.
 
Graduated in cinema at London Film School and in economics at Universidade Cândido Mendes, Aluizio became known for taking to the cinema screens challenging projects, both in their strategies of creation as well in their themes, with a prestigious crew and great cast. His mostly recurrent themes are family and love, as a counterpoint to a world full of violence, fear and intolerance.
 
A Glass of Rage is based on the novel of the Brazilian writer Raduan Nassar. The Three Marias is a shakespearean tragedy in the countryside of Pernambuco. From Beginning to End addresses unconditional love between two brothers and it is the third film that Aluizio Works with  Julia Lemmertz, who stars the movie with Fábio Assunção, Rafael Cardoso and João Gabriel Vasconcellos.
In Happily Married, Aluizio rejoins the partnership with Alexandre Borges, who stars in the comedy with Camila Morgado.

Filmography 

 1989 - A Porta Aberta (short film)
 1999 - A Glass of Rage (Um Copo de Cólera)
 2002 - The Three Marias (As Três Marias)
 2009 - From Beginning to End (Do Começo ao Fim)
 2015 - Happily Married (Bem casados)

References

External links
 
http://www.filmeb.com.br/quem-e-quem/diretor-produtor-roteirista/aluizio-abranches

20th-century Brazilian Jews
Brazilian film directors
Brazilian film producers
Living people
Year of birth missing (living people)